The corporate ekiden competition is a series of races contested between Japan's corporate (business) running teams. The championships are officially the ),The structure involves regional qualifying races and a national championship for women and for men.

Women's Championship
The All-Japan Women’s Corporate (Jitsugyodan) Ekiden Championship is held in mid December after 3 regional qualifying ekiden (2011 summary) events, narrowing the field to 24 to 27 teams, although new qualification standards in 2011 increased the field to 33 teams. In addition to teams coming from the East Japan qualifying meet, there are teams from the Central Japan and Western Japan qualifying meets.

Men's Championship
The All-Japan Men's Corporate Ekiden Championship, also called the New Year Ekiden, takes place in Japan's Gunma Prefecture on 1 January.

Qualification Structure
Teams gain qualification into the final ekiden race through a series of preliminaries which are principally conducted on a district-by-district basis. The Eastern Japan Corporate Ekiden Championship qualifies men's and women's teams. Two other qualifying meets for the women are held for Central Japan and Western Japan, (women's divisions detailed in Japanese). The Western Japan women's qualifying race (6 stages, 42.195 km, 31st race on October 23, 2011) begins in Munakata, Fukuoka; website.

The men have a slightly different pattern (men's divisions detailed in Japanese). One of the men's qualifying races is the Kyushu men's qualifying race (7 stages, 78.8 km, 48th on November 23, 2011), which begins in Fukuoka City and ends in Kita Kyushu city; 2010 video. Other regionals include Kansai Jitsugyodan Ekiden (2010 - 53rd, held in Tabe), Chubu Jitsugyodan Ekiden (2010 - 50th, held in Gero, Gifu), Hokuriku Jitsugyodan Ekiden (2010 - 40th, held in Gero, Gifu), and Chugoku Jitsugyodan Ekiden (2010 - 49th, held in Sera, Hiroshima).

Qualification Round - Eastern Japan Corporate Ekiden Championships 	
Konosu City, Saitama Prefecture, has hosted for several years the men's and women's Eastern Japan Corporate (Jitsugyodan) Ekiden Championships (2011 meet website). The meet site is Kumagaya Sports Culture Park (熊谷スポーツ文化公園陸上競技). This meet is a regional qualifier for the December women's and January 1 men's national championships. The women run a 6-stage 42.195 kilometer (full marathon) race and the men run a 7-stage 77.5 km race. The 2011 race was the meet's 22nd women's championship and the men's 52nd. 2011 race highlights in English; Japanese television website.

Men

Women

Qualification Round - Western Japan Corporate Ekiden Championships 
The Western Japan women's qualifying race (6 stages, 42.195 km) begins in Munakata, Fukuoka; website.  The 31st annual race was held on October 23, 2011.

References 

Ekiden
Road running competitions in Japan
Sport in Gunma Prefecture

ja:全日本実業団対抗駅伝競走大会